Markus Andersson (born 17 February 1973) is a Swedish cyclist. He competed in the men's individual road race at the 1996 Summer Olympics.

References

External links
 

1973 births
Living people
Swedish male cyclists
Olympic cyclists of Sweden
Cyclists at the 1996 Summer Olympics
Sportspeople from Stockholm